Jason Campbell Kyle (born May 12, 1972) is a former American football long snapper. He was drafted by the Seattle Seahawks in the fourth round of the 1995 NFL Draft. He played college football at Arizona State.

Kyle also played for the Cleveland Browns, San Francisco 49ers, Carolina Panthers, and New Orleans Saints.

Kyle was the long snapper for the Saints during their Super Bowl winning 2009 season and for the first nine games of 2010, but due to a shoulder injury he was then placed on the injured reserve list, ending his season.

College

Kyle received a full athletic scholarship to Arizona State University as a linebacker where he led the Pac-10 in tackles. He was chosen to play in the East/West Shrine Game, Senior Bowl, and the Blue/Grey Game. Academically, he received the Sun Angel Chairman’s Award, First-team Academic All-Pacific-10 Award, and Maroon and Gold Scholar Athlete Award. He earned a marketing degree.

NFL
Kyle was drafted by the Seattle Seahawks in 1995 as a linebacker.  Over the career of sixteen years Kyle moved from linebacker to long snapping.  He played his last season in 2010 with the New Orleans Saints and was a member of the 2010 Super Bowl Champions. Kyle also served on the board of directors for the NFLPA.

References

External links
 New Orleans Saints bio
 ProPlayerConnect Receives $3MM Funding

1972 births
Living people
Sportspeople from Tempe, Arizona
Players of American football from Arizona
American football linebackers
American football long snappers
Arizona State Sun Devils football players
Seattle Seahawks players
Cleveland Browns players
San Francisco 49ers players
Carolina Panthers players
New Orleans Saints players